Gary Mortimer Solomon (born 15 September 1973) is a Guyanese-born Sint Maartener cricketer.

A right-handed batsman and right-arm medium pace bowler, Solomon was selected in Sint Maarten's squad for the 2006 Stanford 20/20, playing in their preliminary round loss to the United States Virgin Islands (USVI). Opening the batting alongside Royston Trocard, Solomon was dismissed without scoring by Dane Weston. In the USVI innings he bowled a single over, taking the wicket of Mark Vitalis and conceding six runs. This marks Solomon's only appearance in Twenty20 cricket.

See also
List of Sint Maarten Twenty20 players

References

External links
Gary Solomon at ESPNcricinfo
Gary Solomon at CricketArchive

Living people
1973 births
Guyanese emigrants to Sint Maarten
Sint Maarten cricketers
Sint Maarten representative cricketers